Lipelaneng is a community council located in the Butha-Buthe and Leribe Districts of Lesotho. Its population in 2006 was 30,320.

Villages
The community of Lipelaneng includes the villages of Baroeng, Botha-Bothe Reserve, Ha Kamoho, Ha Koabeng (Mabothile), Ha Lekhooana (Matebeleng), Ha Lekili, Ha Majara, Ha Makakamela (Ha Rampai), Ha Maletatso, Ha Mapape (Mekhotlong), Ha Mokete, Ha Mokhoka, Ha Mopeli, Ha Morathaba, Ha Mothetsi, Ha Nqabeni, Ha Qoati, Ha Ramokema, Ha Sebeko, Ha Sechele, Ha Sepetla, Ha Serole, Ha Shepeseli, Ha Shepheseli, Ha Thabo (Liqalaneng), Khapung, Lerallaneng, Likhefing, Likhutlong (Mahlabatheng), Likileng, Likoting, Lipelaneng, Liqalaneng, Lithakong, Mabothile, Maholeng, Majakaneng, Makong, Makopo, Mamohololi, Maoeng, Marallaneng, Masaleng, Masheeng, Matebeleng, Moholokohlong (Matlakeng), Mokhanthane, Morifi, Paballong (Motse-Mocha), Peqeng (Matlakeng), Phahama, Phahameng, Phaphama, Qaphaulane, Sekoting, Tarabane, Taung (Ha Rampai), Thabana-Mokhele, Thabong, Thata-Moli, Thotaneng (Matlakeng), Thoteng (Ha Shepeseli) and Tlokoeng.

References

External links
 Google map of community villages

Populated places in Butha-Buthe District